RBH, or rbh, may refer to:

 RBH Logistics, a subsidiary of DB Schenker
 Red Book of Hergest, a Welsh manuscript written shortly after 1382
 Rothmans, Benson & Hedges, a Canadian tobacco manufacturer
 Royal Bafokeng Holdings, the Sovereign Wealth Fund of the Royal Bafokeng Nation of South Africa 
 Royal Berkshire Hospital, a general hospital in Reading, Berkshire, UK
 Royal Bolton Hospital, an acute general hospital in Farnworth, Manchester, UK
 Rubidium hydride (RbH), a chemical compound
 Rutherford B. Hayes (1822–1893), 19th president of the United States

See also

 RBHS (disambiguation)